Nernier is a French village on the southern shore of Lake Geneva, in the department of Haute-Savoie.

Administratively classified a commune, Nernier shares a medieval village center and floral displays with the larger and better-known neighbouring village of Yvoire.

See also
Communes of Haute-Savoie

References

External links

 Nernier webpage (in French)
 Gazetteer Entry for Nernier
 Club Nautique Nernier-Yvoire

Communes of Haute-Savoie
Populated places on Lake Geneva